The 9th Annual Bengal Film Journalists' Association Awards was held on 1946, honoring the best Indian cinema in 1945.

Main Awards

Best Indian Films (In Order of Merit) 
 Bhabikal
 Parbat Pe Apna Dera
 Dui Purush
 Kashinath
 Ek Din Ka Sultan
 Aina
 Din Raat
 Mun Ki Jit
 Devdasi
 Mazdoor

Best Director 
Niren Lahiri - Bhabikal

Best Actor 
Debi Mukherjee - Bhabikal

Best Actress 
Chandravati - Dui Purush

Best Actor in Supporting Role 
Amar Mullick - Bhabikal

Best Actress in Supporting Role 
Probha Debi - Mane Na Mana

Best Music Director 
Pankaj Mullick - Dui Purush

Best Lyricist 
Sailen Roy - Dui Purush

Best Cinematographer 
Sudhin Majumder - Dui Purush

Best Audiographer 
Loken Bose - Dui Purush

Best Dialogue 
Premendra Mitra - Bhabikal

Best Art Director 
Souren Sen - Dui Purush

Best Screenplay 
Bhabikal

Hindi Section

Best Director 
V. Shantaram - Parbat Pe Apna Dera

Best Actor 
Prithviraj Kapoor - Devdasi

Best Actress 
Geeta Nizami - Panna

Best Actor in Supporting Role 
Yakub - Aina

Best Actress in Supporting Role 
Ranjit Kumari - Chal Chal Re Naujawan

Best Music Director 
Amir Ali - Panna

Best Lyricist 
Gopal Singh - Mazdoor

Best Cinematographer 
V. Avadhoot - Parbat Pe Apna Dera

Best Audiographer 
A. K. Parmar - Parbat Pe Apna Dera

Best Dialogue 
Upendra Nath Ashk - Mazdoor

Best Art Director 
Russi K. Banker - Ek Din Ka Sultan

Best Screenplay 
Parbat Pe Apna Dera

Foreign Film Section

Ten Best Films 
 Gaslight
 The Lost Weekend
 Arsenic and Old Lace
 A Song to Remember
 Wilson
 A Thousand and One Nights
 Henry V
 Dragon Seed
 The Seventh Cross
 The Picture of Dorian Gray

Best Director 
Billy Wilder - The Lost Weekend

Best Actor 
Cary Grant - Arsenic and Old Lace

Best Actress 
Ingrid Bergman - Gaslight

References

Bengal Film Journalists' Association Awards